Paris is an abandoned settlement on the island of Kiritimati, in Kiribati.

Name 
It was named after the city of Paris, France. It is one of the settlements on the island to be named after European places, along with nearby London and Poland.

History 
It was the home of Father Emmanuel Rougier, a French priest who leased the island from 1917 to 1939 and planted thousands of coconut trees there.

The remains of the former village are located at Benson Point, near the southern entrance to the large lagoon which dominates the western half of the island. Though only a short distance from London, the principal settlement on Kiritimati, the lagoon and its entrance channels actually place it a long distance away from present-day habitation. Also, as there is no good anchorage at the southern lagoon entrance, this relative lack of easy access probably led to the village being abandoned in favor of London.

References 

Former populated places in Kiribati
Kiritimati